The Manchurian hare (Lepus mandshuricus) is a species of hare found in northeastern China and Russia, the Amur River basin, and the higher mountains of northern North Korea. It lives in forests and the IUCN has assessed its conservation status as being of "least concern".

Description
The ears are typically 7.5–10.4 centimeters in length. Compared to the Korean hare, its hind legs are relatively short and its ears relatively small. A melanistic morph exists, and has been described as the separate species Lepus melainus.

Distribution and habitat
The Manchurian hare is native to eastern Russia and northeastern China. Its range extends eastwards from the Ussuri River region of Russia, through the Chinese provinces of Heilongjiang, Jilin, Liaoning and Inner Mongolia and possibly extends as far as North Korea, where its range may overlap with that of the Korean hare (Lepus coreanus). It is found in forests and has a preference for mixed woodlands over coniferous forest. It tends to avoid open areas and keeps away from human settlements.

Status
The Manchurian hare has a wide range and is present in a number of reserves. Its chief threat is the degradation of its forest habitat and the consequent spread of the tolai hare (Lepus tolai) which breeds prolifically and with which it is unable to compete. Its present population size and population trend are unknown, and the International Union for Conservation of Nature has assessed its conservation status as being of "least concern".

References

External links

Lepus
Mammals of China
Mammals of Korea
Mammals of Russia
Mammals described in 1861
Taxa named by Gustav Radde